One Hour with You is a 1932 American pre-Code musical comedy film about a married couple who are attracted to other people. It was produced and directed by Ernst Lubitsch "with the assistance of" George Cukor, and written by Samson Raphaelson from the play Only a Dream by Lothar Schmidt. It stars Maurice Chevalier, Jeanette MacDonald, Genevieve Tobin, Charlie Ruggles and Roland Young. A French-language version titled Une heure près de toi was produced simultaneously, with Lili Damita playing Tobin's role.

The film is a musical remake of The Marriage Circle (1924), the second film that Lubitsch directed in the United States. One Hour with You was nominated for the Academy Award for Best Picture.

The film was preserved by the UCLA Film and Television Archive with its original color tints restored.

Plot
Parisian doctor Andre Bertier is faithful to his loving wife Colette, much to the surprise of his lovely female patients. But when Colette's best friend Mitzi Olivier insists upon being treated by Dr. Bertier, his devotion is put to the test.

Cast
 Maurice Chevalier as Dr. Andre Bertier
 Jeanette MacDonald as Colette Bertier
 Genevieve Tobin as Mitzi Olivier
 Charles Ruggles as Adolph
 Roland Young as Professor Olivier
 Josephine Dunn as Mademoiselle Martel
 Richard Carle as Henri Dornier, Private Detective
 Barbara Leonard as Mitzi's Maid
 George Barbier as Police Commissioner
 Donald Novis as Crooner
 Charles Coleman as Marcel (uncredited) 
 Kent Taylor as Party Guest (uncredited)

Carole Lombard and Kay Francis were the first choices to costar in the film.

Soundtrack
Unless otherwise noted, the music is written by Oscar Straus and the lyrics are written by Leo Robin.

 "One Hour with You", music by Richard A. Whiting, performed by the Coconut Orchestra with vocal by Donald Novis, also sung by Genevieve Tobin and Maurice Chevalier, Charlie Ruggles and Jeanette MacDonald, and Chevalier and MacDonald
 "Police Station Number" (uncredited), music by John Leipold
 "We Will Always Be Sweethearts", sung by MacDonald
 "What Would You Do?", sung by Chevalier
 "Oh That Mitzi", sung by Chevalier
 "Three Times a Day", sung by Tobin
 "What a Little Thing Like a Wedding Ring Can Do", sung by Chevalier and MacDonald
 "It Was Only a Dream Kiss", sung by Chevalier and MacDonald

Production
Lubitsch was originally scheduled to direct One Hour with You and supervised the project in preproduction, but was unable to direct because his previous film, The Man I Killed, went beyond schedule. George Cukor was instead assigned to direct. Within two weeks after filming had begun, conflicts between Chevalier and Cukor brought Lubitsch back, although Cukor remained on the set. Cukor and Lubitsch each demanded sole credit for directing and the matter was litigated in court. Before a judgment was rendered, Cukor received a credit for assisting the direction and the right to break his contract with Paramount in order to direct What Price Hollywood? at RKO.

References
Notes

External links
 
 
 
 
 
 One Hour with You at Jeanette MacDonald and Nelson Eddy: A Tribute
 Criterion Collection essay by Michael Koresky
 IMDb link to various One Hour with You reviews

1932 films
1932 musical comedy films
1932 romantic comedy films
American musical comedy films
American romantic comedy films
Remakes of American films
American romantic musical films
American black-and-white films
American films based on plays
Films directed by George Cukor
Films directed by Ernst Lubitsch
Films set in Paris
Paramount Pictures films
American multilingual films
Sound film remakes of silent films
Films scored by John Leipold
Films scored by Oscar Straus
1932 multilingual films
1930s English-language films
1930s American films